Black is a 2004 Indian Malayalam language neo-noir action thriller film written and directed by Ranjith, and produced by Lal. It deals with the underworld operations in Kochi. Mammootty plays the role of Police Constable Karikkamuri Shanmugham, who is a hit man and a contract killer. The film features cinematography by Amal Neerad. The film was a comeback for actor Rahman to Malayalam cinema. The movie was released on November 12 on the occasion of Diwali

Plot 
The plot revolves around Shanmugham and Adv. Devin Carlos Padaveedan, who runs an organized crime syndicate of Kochi. Shanmugham "Kumbari", moonlights as a police constable, but never wears his uniform. Padaveedan suspects Shanmugham, because of his interaction with SI Ashok Srinivas. Padaveedan turns against Shanmugham and orders his lieutenants to finish him. Shanmugham couldn't believe his betrayal, but eventually finishes Padaveedan and his men. Thus, the city gets rid of some of its most dangerous criminals. In the end, Shanmugham, moves out to start a new life with his deaf daughter and Anandam.

Cast

 Mammootty as Head Constable Karikkamuri Shanmughan aka Kumbari
 Lal as Adv. Devin Carlos Padaveedan
 Rahman as Sub Inspector  Ashok Srinivas
 Janaki Krishnan as Anna
 Shreya Reddy as Anandam
 Babu Antony as City Police Commissioner Govind Chengappa IPS
 Janardanan as Aasan
 Mohan Jose as Mammali
 Tom George Kolath as Ajay Srinivas
 Kulappully Leela as Veronica
 Sona Nair as Sheela
 T. P. Madhavan
 Prem Kumar as Unni
 Sadiq as Mustafa
 Ramu as Francis
 Daniel Balaji as Ezhumalai
 Anoop Chandran as Pauly
 Joju George
 Besant Ravi
 Meenakshi (Cameo appearance in the song Ambalakkara)

Release
The film was released on 10 November 2004.

Box office
The film was box office hit
.

Soundtrack
Music: Alex Paul
Lyrics: Ranjith, Kaithapram, Pirai Choodan

 "Ambalakkara" - M. G. Sreekumar, Chorus
 "Ambalakkara" (Extended) - M. G. Sreekumar
 "Thinkal Kalaye" - Sujatha Mohan

References

External links
 

2004 films
2000s Malayalam-language films
2004 crime thriller films
Indian crime thriller films
Fictional portrayals of the Kerala Police
Films shot in Kochi
Films scored by Rajamani
Films directed by Ranjith